Simon Paulus Olij (5 October 1900, Landsmeer – 4 August 1975, Amsterdam) was a Dutch heavyweight boxer who attended the 1928 Summer Olympics. During World War II, he was a Nazi collaborator. Olij was later sentenced to death but was reprieved and served a seven-year prison sentence.

Boxing
There he was eliminated in the quarterfinals of the men's heavyweight division by eventual gold medalist Arturo Rodríguez from Argentina.  His result was: (in Dutch)

 Round of 16: defeated Joe Goyder (Great Britain) by decision
 Quarterfinal: lost to Arturo Rodriguez (Argentina) on points

Nazi collaborator 

Olij, and his son Jan, became members of the National Socialist Movement in the Netherlands (NSB) during the Second World War. Olij and his son betrayed and arrested numerous Jewish people who were deported as part of The Holocaust. One of them was fellow Jewish Dutch boxing Olympian Ben Bril and his family.

After the war he was sentenced to death for his role in The Holocaust. However, his sentence was commuted to life imprisonment which itself was repealed. After a psychiatric assessment Olij had his sentence commuted to nine years imprisonment. He was released in June 1954. His son, Jan, while awaiting trial escaped from an internment camp in 1947 and fled to Argentina where he died in 1996.

Later life
Olij died in 1975 in Amsterdam.

References

1900 births
1975 deaths
Boxers at the 1928 Summer Olympics
Heavyweight boxers
Olympic boxers of the Netherlands
People from Landsmeer
Dutch male boxers
Sportspeople from North Holland

Dutch collaborators with Nazi Germany